The 2015–16 Azerbaijan Premier League was the 24th season of Azerbaijan Premier League, the Azerbaijani professional league for association football clubs, since its establishment in 1992. Qarabağ were the defending champions, having won the 2014–15 Azerbaijan season.

Teams 
Zira FK entered the Premier League one year after their formation, and Kapaz PFK returned to the top level after two years of absence. Zira and Kapaz became fifth and ninth, respectively, in the 2014–15 First Division. They replaced Araz-Naxçıvan PFK, which withdrew from the league in November 2014, and Baku FC, which was relegated at the end of the previous season.

On 21 June 2015 the Professional Football League of Azerbaijan announced that Simurq PIK had refused to play in the 2015–16 Premier League due to ongoing financial problems. They were replaced by Ravan Baku FK, which became third in the 2014–15 First Division after they were relegated from the Premier League one season earlier.

Stadia and locations
Note: Table lists in alphabetical order.

Personnel and kits

Note: Flags indicate national team as has been defined under FIFA eligibility rules. Players may hold more than one non-FIFA nationality.

Managerial changes

League table

Results

Games 1–18

Games 19–36

Season statistics

Scoring
 First goal of the season: Victor Igbekoi for Zira against AZAL (9 August 2015)
 Fastest goal of the season: 1st minute, 
 Dodô for Gabala against Khazar Lankaran (4 October 2015)
 Latest goal of the season: 95th minute, 
 Facundo Pereyra for Gabala against Ravan Baku (30 November 2015)
 Tural Akhundov for Kapaz against Sumgayit (7 December 2015)
 Largest winning margin: 6 goals
 Gabala 6-0 Khazar Lankaran (4 October 2015)
 Highest scoring game: 6 goals
 Gabala 6-0 Khazar Lankaran (4 October 2015)
Sumgayit 3-3 Ravan (19 December 2015)
 Qarabağ 5-1 Ravan (30 March 2016)
 Most goals scored in a match by a single team: 6 goals
 Gabala 6-0 Khazar Lankaran (4 October 2015)

Top scorers

Hat-tricks

Discipline

Player
 Most yellow cards: 10
 Ailton - Neftchi Baku
 Éric Ramos - Neftchi Baku
 Emin Mehdiyev - Sumgayit
 Most red cards: 2
 Adrian Scarlatache - Khazar Lankaran 
 Elshan Rzazadä - Khazar Lankaran 
 Jairo - Neftchi Baku
 Ailton - Neftchi Baku
 Emin Mehdiyev - Sumgayit

Club
 Most yellow cards: 81
 Neftchi Baku
 Most red cards: 7
 Neftchi Baku

References

External links
 

2015–16 in European association football leagues
2015-16
1